Nicole Renee Barnhart (born October 10, 1981) is an American soccer player who plays as a goalkeeper for Washington Spirit in the National Women's Soccer League (NWSL). She previously played for FC Gold Pride and Philadelphia Independence in Women's Professional Soccer, and for the United States national team where she was a two-time Olympic gold medalist. She competed in qualifying matches for 2008 Beijing Olympics and 2011 FIFA Women's World Cup,  2011 Four Nations Tournament and 2011 Algarve Cup.

Early life
Barnhart was born in Pottstown, Pennsylvania and grew up in Gilbertsville, Pennsylvania. She attended Boyertown High School in Berks County, Pennsylvania where she played for the boys' team for all four years, playing on the field as well as in goal. She also played basketball and lacrosse, and was named an All-American.

Stanford University
Barnhart played college soccer for the Stanford Cardinal at Stanford University.  She was named an all-Pacific-10 Conference player in 2002, 2003 and 2004, and holds the Stanford women's record for lowest career goals-against average (0.41).

Club career

In 2009, Barnhart was allocated to FC Gold Pride for the inaugural season of Women's Professional Soccer (WPS).

In 2010, Barnhart helped the FC Gold Pride to the 2010 WPS title, starting 21 games and playing 1880 minutes while making 73 saves and allowing just 16 goals. She had eight shutouts, including the WPS championship game, and was named the WPS Goalkeeper of the Year and a WPS All-Star. She made 74 saves, allowed 23 goals for a 1.44 goals against average (GAA) and earned two shutouts.

In 2011, she signed with the Philadelphia Independence for the 2011 WPS season and started nine total matches to help the club to a WPS playoff berth and a berth in the championship game. She earned a shutout in the 2–0 Super Semifinal victory against magicJack. Barnhart compiled a 4–3–2 record with three shutouts and had a goals against average (GAA) of 1.11.

FC Kansas City, 2013-2017
On January 11, 2013, Barnhart was one of three members from the United States women's national team that was allocated to the new NWSL club FC Kansas City, along with Lauren Cheney and Becky Sauerbrunn via the NWSL Player Allocation. Her 2013 regular-season record of ten scoreless "clean sheet" games remained until surpassed by Adrianna Franch in a longer, 2017 season. In August 2013, she was named NWSL Goalkeeper of the Year.

Barnhart appeared in 22 games in 2014, recording 8 clean sheets. She played in both the semi-final and final for FCKC, helping them to win the 2014 NWSL Championship over the Seattle Reign.

In 2015 she was named to the NWSL second XI after recording 8 clean sheets in 17 games. Barnhart was crowned NWSL Champion again in 2015 as FC Kansas City defeated Seattle Reign in the final for the second straight year.

Barnhart had similarly strong numbers in 2016, starting 20 games and recording 6 clean sheets, but FC Kansas City failed to qualify for the playoffs. In 2017 Barnhart started all 24 games for FC Kansas City, and recorded 6 shutouts, however FCKC missed the playoffs for the second straight year.

Utah Royals FC, 2018–2021
After FC Kansas City ceased operations following the 2017 season, Barnhart was officially added to the roster of the Utah Royals FC on February 12, 2018. Barnhart made her debut for the Royals on June 2 against Sky Blue FC as starting goalkeeper Abby Smith was away on international duty.

KC NWSL, 2021
Prior to the start of the 2021 season the Utah Royals were sold to KC NWSL. Barhart and Abby Smith Split time until Barnhart was released on July 28 by the club.

Washington Spirit
Barnhart signed with Washington Spirit in January 2022.

International career
Barnhart has appeared in 53 matches for the United States women's national soccer team. She made her debut in a five-minute appearance as forward against Mexico on October 16, 2004.  As the third U.S. goalkeeper at the 2007 FIFA Women's World Cup, she was only expected to see action in the event of injuries to Hope Solo and Briana Scurry.

Barnhart was the hero of the U.S. Women's 2008 CONCACAF final against Canada when she saved a penalty that won the final.

Barnhart was a member of the gold medal-winning USA team at 2008 Beijing Olympic, although she did not appear in a match with Hope Solo playing all six U.S. matches.

In 2010, with Solo out for shoulder surgery and recovery, Barnhart started 11 matches, with 8 wins, 1 loss, and 2 draws, and allowed 5 goals in 990 minutes; including 5 matches in CONCACAF qualifying tournament for FIFA Women's World Cup and 2 shutout playoff matches against Italy that secured the berth for 2011 FIFA Women's World Cup. In 2011, she started 9 matches and won 2 tournaments, at the Four Nations Tournament in China in January and the Algarve Cup in Portugal in March; with 6 wins, 2 losses, and 1 draw. She was on the roster for the 2011 FIFA Women's World Cup alongside Hope Solo, but did not get playing time.

At the 2012 London Olympics, Nicole Barnhart received her second Olympic gold medal as a standby goalkeeper for the United States; she did not get playing time, with Hope Solo playing every minute of the United States' six matches.

As a standby goalkeeper to Briana Scurry and Hope Solo, Barnhart has not competed in a single match in an Olympic or a FIFA World Cup tournament.

Coaching
Barnhart is currently a volunteer assistant coach at Stanford University.  In the 2011 season as a volunteer assistant coach, she helped lead her alma-mater, the Stanford Cardinal, to its first national championship in Kennesaw, Georgia. The Cardinal defeated the Duke Blue Devils 1–0.

Career statistics

Club career
Updated March 23, 2019

International career

Honors and awards

International
 Olympic Gold Medal: 2008, 2012
 Algarve Cup: 2010, 2011
 Four Nations Tournament: 2011
 FIFA Women's World Cup Runner-up: 2011

Club
with FC Gold Pride:
 WPS championship: 2010

with FC Kansas City:
 NWSL championship: 2014, 2015

Individual
 NWSL Goalkeeper of the Year: 2013

See also

List of Olympic medalists in football
All-time FC Gold Pride roster
List of 2008 Summer Olympics medal winners
List of 2012 Summer Olympics medal winners
List of Stanford University people

References

Further reading
 Grainey, Timothy (2012), Beyond Bend It Like Beckham: The Global Phenomenon of Women's Soccer, University of Nebraska Press, 
 Lisi, Clemente A. (2010), The U.S. Women's Soccer Team: An American Success Story, Scarecrow Press, 
 Stevens, Dakota (2011), A Look at the Women's Professional Soccer Including the Soccer Associations, Teams, Players, Awards, and More, BiblioBazaar, 
 Stewart, Barbara (2012), Women's Soccer: The Passionate Game, Greystone Books Ltd,

External links

 
 US Soccer player profile
 FC Gold Pride profile
 Stanford coaching profile
 Stanford player profile
 FC Kansas City player profile
 
 

Living people
1981 births
United States women's international soccer players
Stanford Cardinal women's soccer players
Olympic gold medalists for the United States in soccer
Footballers at the 2008 Summer Olympics
Footballers at the 2012 Summer Olympics
FC Gold Pride players
Philadelphia Independence players
American women's soccer players
2011 FIFA Women's World Cup players
2007 FIFA Women's World Cup players
Soccer players from Pennsylvania
Sportspeople from Montgomery County, Pennsylvania
National Women's Soccer League players
FC Kansas City players
Medalists at the 2012 Summer Olympics
Medalists at the 2008 Summer Olympics
People from Pottstown, Pennsylvania
Women's association football goalkeepers
Women's association football forwards
Utah Royals FC players
California Storm players
Women's Premier Soccer League players
Kansas City Current players
Women's Professional Soccer players